Helen Ofurum is a Nigerian author of children's English-literature books. She is listed among the authors of the Oxford Encyclopedia of Children's Literature.

Works 
Iheoma Comes To Stay (1982)
 A Welcome for Chijioke (1983)

References 

Nigerian writers
Living people
Year of birth missing (living people)